Kofi Owusu-Ansah (born 17 April 1998), known by his stage name Genesis Owusu, is a Ghanaian-Australian singer from Canberra. He is the younger brother of fellow hip hop rapper, Kojo Owusu-Ansah  Citizen Kay. Owusu's debut studio album, Smiling with No Teeth (March 2021), reached the ARIA Albums Chart top 30. At the 2021 ARIA Music Awards he won four trophies for Album of the Year,  Best Hip Hop Release, Best Independent Release and Best Cover Art (latter shared with Bailey Howard).

Early years 

Genesis Owusu was born Kofi Owusu-Ansah on 17 August 1998 in Koforidua, Ghana. His older brother, Kojo (born ca. 1994), is also a rapper who performs as Citizen Kay. The family migrated to Canberra, Australia in 2000. He was dubbed "Genesis" by Kojo in primary school, who told his friends that his younger brother is Kofi: "his friends were like 'oh, what's your brother's name?' and he said 'Coffee' and they just didn't believe him, for whatever reason. So he just apparently made Genesis up on the spot, and since then it's just stuck." Owusu completed a Bachelor of Journalism at the University of Canberra in 2018. He designs and makes his own clothes and started a fashion line, Pur.

Career

2015–2019: Career beginnings and Cardrive 

Musician Citizen Kay is Owusu's older brother, and he decided to feature his younger brother, among other relatives, on "Family Ties", a track on his album With the People (October 2015). Kay explained that "Family Ties"
… is a song about the appreciation of my family and how they've played parts in who I am, both as a person and as a writer/artist. It seemed fitting to get fellow rapping family members on the verses. 

The pair then performed and recorded as the Ansah Brothers and in 2015 released an extended play (EP), Polaroid. Fellow Canberra rapper Kirklandd took notice and wanted the younger Owusu on his track "We On", which was first issued as a single in August 2016 and then appeared on Kirklandd's September 2016 four-track EP, The Visions Minitape.

From these experiences, Owusu gained confidence, connections, and fans enough to encourage him to try a solo career. In June 2017, he released his seven-track debut EP, Cardrive. BMA Magazines Matt Parnell wrote that
the throaty, deep voice, the swagger-infused flow and menacing, jazzy beats give each track a distinctive flavour. Additionally, the polished sound and confidence with which each tune is presented gives the sound an experienced feeling that belies the age of the artist. 
The single "Sideways", released in September, includes lyrics in Twi, a dialect of Akan. It received national exposure on youth radio Triple J. Owusu toured Australia's east coast to promote it. Of "Sideways", i-Ds Isabelle Hellyer wrote
Where [Owusu's] older work would flit between jazz and hip hop, 'Sideways' synthesises both genres into sound of his own.

The singer rejected the archetypical objectification of women by hip hop artists with his second single, "Awomen Amen" (2018), and explained, "As a rapper, I never used to hear those kinds of messages... it was something that always bothered me." He released a double A-sided single, "WUTD"/"Vultures" early in 2019, which Caitlin Medcalf of Purple Sneakers reviewed, "[WUTD is] a smooth, RnB track I guarantee will never get out of your head and, 'Vultures', a wavy rap journey... [his] vocals match the mood with a drawling vocal melody and a light flow that never once feels sharp, but simply goes with the flow." On 3 July 2019 Owusu performed as an opening act at 5 Seconds of Summer's sold-out benefit concert in Sydney. "WUTD" was featured on an ad for Bose noise-cancelling headphones in October 2019.

2020–2021: Smiling with No Teeth

Owusu's debut studio album, Smiling with No Teeth, was released on 5 March 2021. The album peaked at number 27 on the ARIA charts. In July, a deluxe version was released titled Missing Molars (SWNT Deluxe). The album went on to win several awards, including ARIA Award for Album of the Year and Australian Music Prize.

2022: "GTFO" 
On 20 July 2022, Owusu released "GTFO", alongside its Rhett Wade-Ferrell directed video. It is Owusu's first single of 2022.

Backing band members

Current members
 Kirin J. Callinan – guitar
 Touch Sensitive (Michael Di Francesco) – bass guitar
 Julian Sudek – drums 
 Andrew Klippel – keyboard
 Jonti – guitar, keyboard

Discography

Studio albums

Extended plays

Singles

As lead artist

As featured artist

Awards and nominations

AIR Awards
The Australian Independent Record Awards (commonly known informally as AIR Awards) is an annual awards night to recognise, promote and celebrate the success of Australia's Independent Music sector.

! 
|-
| rowspan="3"| 2022
| rowspan="2"| Smiling with No Teeth
| Independent Album of the Year
|  
| rowspan="3"| 
|-
| Best Independent Hip Hop Album or EP
|  
|-
| "Smiling with No Teeth"
| Independent Song of the Year
|

APRA Awards
The APRA Awards are held in Australia and New Zealand by the Australasian Performing Right Association to recognise songwriting skills, sales and airplay performance by its members annually

! 
|-
| rowspan="2"| 2022
| "The Other Black Dog"
| Song of the Year
| 
| rowspan="2"|
|-
| Genesis Owusu
| Breakthrough Songwriter of the Year
| 
|-
| 2023 
| "GTFO"
| Song of the Year 
|  
|  
|-

ARIA Music Awards
The Australian Recording Industry Association Music Awards (commonly known as the ARIA Music Awards, the ARIA Awards, or simply the ARIAs) recognise excellence, innovation, and achievement across all genres of Australian music. Owusu has won four awards from twelve nominations.

! 
|-
| 2019
| "WUTD" / "Vultures"
| rowspan="2"| Best Soul/R&B Release
| 
| 
|-
| 2020
| "Don't Need You"
| 
|
|-
| rowspan="7"| 2021||rowspan="4"| Smiling with No Teeth ||Album of the Year ||  
| rowspan="7"| 
|-
| Best Artist ||  
|-
| Best Hip Hop Release ||  
|-
| Best Independent Release ||  
|-
| Smiling With No Teeth Album Tour || Best Australian Live Act ||  
|-
| Andrew Klippel, Dave Hammer for Genesis Owusu – Smiling with No Teeth || Producer of the Year ||  
|-
| Kofi Anash & Bailey Howard for Genesis Owusu – Smiling with No Teeth || Best Cover Art ||  
|-
| rowspan="3"| 2022
| "GTFO"
| Best Independent Release
| 
| rowspan="3"| 
|-
| Genesis Owusu & The Black Dog Band
| Best Australian Live Act
| 
|-
| "GTFO" (Genesis Owusu, Uncle Friendly)
| Best Video 
| 
|-

Australian Music Prize
The Australian Music Prize (the AMP) is an annual award of $30,000 given to an Australian band or solo artist in recognition of the merit of an album released during the year of award. It commenced in 2005.

! 
|-
! scope="row"| 2021
| Smiling with No Teeth
| Australian Music Prize
| 
|

J Awards
The J Awards are an annual series of Australian music awards that were established by the Australian Broadcasting Corporation's youth-focused radio station Triple J. They commenced in 2005.

! 
|-
| rowspan="2"| 2021
| Smiling with No Teeth
| Australian Album of the Year
| 
| rowspan="2"| 
|-
| "The Other Black Dog" (directed by Riley Blakeway)
| Australian Video of the Year
| 
|}

National Live Music Awards
The National Live Music Awards (NLMAs) are a broad recognition of Australia's diverse live industry, celebrating the success of the Australian live scene. The awards commenced in 2016.

! 
|-
! scope="row"| 2017
| rowspan="5"| Himself
| rowspan="3"| Live Hip Hop Act of the Year
| 
| 
|-
! scope="row"| 2018
| 
| 
|-
! scope="row" rowspan="2"| 2019
| 
| 
|-
| ACT Live Voice of the Year
| 
| 
|-
! scope="row"| 2020
| Live Act of the Year
| 
| 
|}

Rolling Stone Australia Awards
The Rolling Stone Australia Awards are awarded annually in January or February by the Australian edition of Rolling Stone magazine for outstanding contributions to popular culture in the previous year.

! 
|-
|rowspan="2"| 2022
| Smiling with No Teeth
| Best Record
| 
|rowspan="2"| 
|-
| Genesis Owusu
| Best New Artist
|

Vanda & Young Global Songwriting Competition
The Vanda & Young Global Songwriting Competition is an annual competition that "acknowledges great songwriting whilst supporting and raising money for Nordoff-Robbins" and is coordinated by Albert Music and APRA AMCOS. It commenced in 2009.

! 
|-
| 2021
| "Gold Chains"
| Vanda & Young Global Songwriting Competition
| style="background:gold;"| 1st
|
|-

References

1998 births
APRA Award winners
ARIA Award winners
Australian hip hop musicians
Ghanaian emigrants to Australia
Living people
Musicians from Canberra